Jan Frederik Schaap was a Scoutmaster in The Hague and a front man in the first decades of Scouting in The Netherlands.

History
Schaap's contributions to Scouting include the Dutch translation of Scouting for Boys (1924 and several later editions), and other Scouting books. In The Hague, he led the '2nd The Hague Troup', together with Philip baron van Pallandt (who later inherited his uncle's estates Het Laar en Eerde in Ommen). The estate Het Laar contained the site for Gilwell Ada's Hoeve. In July 1923, Schaap organized the first Dutch Wood Badge Scout leadership training on Scout centre Gilwell Ada's Hoeve in Ommen. As the editor of the monthly magazine De Padvinder (1914 onward), he wrote the campsong of the 5th World Scout Jamboree in Vogelenzang.().

References

1893 births
Year of death missing
Scouting and Guiding in the Netherlands
People from The Hague